HMS Chatham was a 50-gun fourth rate ship of the line of the Royal Navy, designed by Sir Joseph Allin and built by his son Edward Allin at Portsmouth Dockyard to the draught specified by the 1745 Establishment as amended in 1752, and launched on 25 April 1758.

Career

The Chatham, was a part of the British flotilla anchored off Staten Island on 25 June 1776, in the opening phases of the Battle of Long Island.

On 2 September 1781 Chatham captured the French frigate Magicienne off Cape Ann after a sanguinary engagement. Magicienne was serving in Orvilliers' fleet under Captain Janvre de la Bouchetière  In the action the French lost 60 men killed and 40 wounded; the British lost one man killed and one man wounded. Magicienne was described as being of 800 tons, 36 guns and 280 men. She was subsequently taken to Halifax and recommissioned in the Royal Navy as HMS Magicienne.

Fate
Chatham was placed on harbour service in 1793, and continued in this role until 1814, when the decision was taken to have her broken up.

Citations

References

 
 
Lavery, Brian (2003) The Ship of the Line – Volume 1: The development of the battlefleet 1650–1850. Conway Maritime Press. .

Ships of the line of the Royal Navy
1758 ships